Sofiane Khayat (born 5 May 1999) is a professional footballer, who plays for Stade Tunisien as a midfielder. Born in France, Khayat is a youth international for Tunisia.

Club career
Khayat joined AS Nancy in 2014, joining from Marseille. He made his professional debut with Nancy in a 1–0 Ligue 2 loss to Paris FC on 15 December 2017.

On 1 February 2020, Khayat joined Stade Tunisien in Tunisia.

International career
Khayat was called up to the Tunisia U20s for 2017 Africa U-20 Cup of Nations qualification matches against the Senegal U20s on 4 May 2017. He made his debut for the Tunisia U20s in a 2–0 loss to the Senegal U20s on 11 June 2016.

References

External links
 
 
 
 ASNL Profile
 UNFP Profile

Living people
1999 births
Footballers from Marseille
Association football midfielders
Tunisian footballers
Tunisia under-23 international footballers
French footballers
French sportspeople of Tunisian descent
AS Nancy Lorraine players
Stade Tunisien players
Ligue 2 players
Championnat National 3 players
Tunisian Ligue Professionnelle 1 players